The 2018 HongRuiMa Yushan World Open was a professional ranking snooker tournament that took place between 6 and 12 August 2018 in Yushan, China. It was the second ranking event of the 2018/19 season.

Qualifying took place between 6–9 July in Preston. Ding Junhui was the defending champion, who defeated Kyren Wilson 10–3 in the 2017 World Open final, but lost 4–5 to Robert Milkins in the last 32 of the 2018 event.

Mark Williams won his 22nd ranking title, defeating David Gilbert 10–9 in the final. Williams trailed 5–9 but won the last 5 frames. It was the fourth time he had won this event, having won it twice when the tournament was named the Grand Prix and once when the tournament was named the LG Cup.

Prize fund
The breakdown of prize money for this year is shown below:

 Winner: £150,000
 Runner-up: £75,000
 Semi-final: £32,500
 Quarter-final: £20,000
 Last 16: £13,000
 Last 32: £8,000
 Last 64: £4,000

 Highest break: £5,000
 Total: £735,000

The "rolling 147 prize" for a maximum break stood at £15,000

Main draw

Final

Qualifying
These matches were held between 6 and 9 July 2018 at the Preston Guild Hall in Preston, England. All matches were best of 9 frames.

Notes

Century breaks

Televised stage centuries

Total: 49

 142, 140, 122, 101  David Gilbert
 142, 111  Noppon Saengkham
 132, 114, 110, 109, 106, 103  Neil Robertson
 128  Michael Holt
 124, 101  Barry Hawkins
 121, 120, 104  Mark Williams
 121, 111  Fergal O'Brien
 120  Ali Carter
 118, 118, 103  Marco Fu
 115, 100  Jack Lisowski
 115, 103  Anthony Hamilton
 115  Ding Junhui
 113, 112, 104, 103  Gary Wilson
 112  Mike Dunn
 111, 101  Xiao Guodong
 109  Stephen Maguire
 108  David Lilley
 107  Ryan Day
 107  Kyren Wilson
 105  Elliot Slessor
 103  Mark Allen
 103  Harvey Chandler
 102  Mark Selby
 102  James Wattana
 102  Jak Jones
 101  Mark Davis
 100  Andrew Higginson
 100  Jamie Jones

Qualifying stage centuries

Total: 14

 140  Robbie Williams
 133  David Gilbert
 131, 109, 108  Noppon Saengkham
 124  Peter Ebdon
 121  Judd Trump
 118, 102  Fergal O'Brien
 118  Marco Fu
 109  Mark Joyce
 108  Joe Perry
 104  Ricky Walden
 102  Mark Allen

References

2018
World Open
World Open (snooker)
Snooker competitions in China
World Open